Jeremadra is a locality in Eurobodalla Shire, New South Wales, Australia. It lies on and to the east of the Princes Highway, about 15 km north of Moruya and 290 km south of Sydney.

References

Towns in New South Wales
Towns in the South Coast (New South Wales)
Eurobodalla Shire
Coastal towns in New South Wales